Horace Clinton Daggett (May 15, 1931 – June 16, 1998) was an American farmer and politician.

Born in Prescott, Adams County, Iowa, Daggett went to public schools in Prescott, Iowa. He served in the Iowa National Guard. Daggett was a farmer, mechanic, and school bus driver. He served on the Lenox Community School Board and served as president of the school board. From 1973 to 1995, Daggett served in the Iowa House of Representatives and was a Republican.

Notes

1931 births
1998 deaths
People from Adams County, Iowa
Farmers from Iowa
School board members in Iowa
Republican Party members of the Iowa House of Representatives
20th-century American politicians